The toothpaste tube theory is a jocular metaphor stating that increasing pressure eventually forces some sort of release, just as when one squeezes a toothpaste tube, toothpaste comes out. It is used to explain social and political behavior, as well as relationships involving abstract concepts.

Applications of the theory 
In administrative law, the toothpaste tube theory describes problems of displacement, for instance, where discretion or accountability are shifted elsewhere. In the case,  Byrnes v. LCI Communication Holdings Co. an appeals court rejected one formulation of the toothpaste tube theory.

In labor law, the toothpaste tube theory means employer and employee relations are always under pressure.

In economics, the toothpaste tube theory may be applied to, for instance, exports. Under this formulation, when home demand is squeezed, exports are extruded.

Other formulations 
Some versions of the toothpaste tube theory observe that there are diminishing returns.

References 

Theories
Logistics
Labour law
Economic theories